Mali made its Paralympic Games début at the 2000 Summer Paralympics in Sydney. The country sent only one athlete (Facourou Sissoko), who competed in powerlifting. He did not win a medal. One of nineteen powerlifters in the men's up to 75 kg category, he lifted 130 kg, placing him last of the seventeen athletes who successfully lifted a weight.

This remains Mali's only participation in the Paralympic Games to date. Although Sissoko intended to return to the Games in 2008, he was banned before being able to compete, having been tested positive for steroids.

Results

See also
Mali at the Paralympics
Mali at the 2000 Summer Olympics

External links
International Paralympic Committee

References

Nations at the 2000 Summer Paralympics
2000
Summer Paralympics